Cuthbert Malajila (3 October 1985 in Rimuka Kadoma, Mashonaland West) is a Zimbabwean footballer who plays as a forward for Premier Soccer League side Black Leopards in South Africa. He also plays for the Zimbabwe national football team.

Career

Club
He started at Chapungu United before moving in 2006 to Highlanders and then to Dynamos Harare. While playing for Highlanders, he scored a hat-trick in a match against Masvingo United, with Highlanders winning the match 4–0. He won the Golden Boot in the top division of Zimbabwean football in 2007.

Malajila had a trial at Belgian club Cercle Brugge, but it ended with the club declining to offer him a contract. He returned to Zimbabwe and to Dynamos afterward, and stated that his focus would be on winning the Golden Boot and in helping his club. He stated that his long-term dream was still on earning a transfer abroad. The striker left his native Zimbabwe in summer 2010 and signed a professional contract of 3 years with the Tunisian side Club Africain in August 2010.

Malajila became the first Zimbabwean to play professional football in Libya after signing for First Division side Al Akhdar on a six-month loan. On 22 January 2012, he completed a move to South African Premier Soccer League side Maritzburg United after the two parties agreed on a transfer fee for the player. In July 2013, Malajila agreed to join Mamelodi Sundowns. He made his Sundowns debut in the following August against Bloemfontein Celtic and scored his first goal for the club in the same match.

International
As of June 2016, Malajila has made 17 appearances for the Zimbabwe national team. His debut came in 2008 in a 2010 FIFA World Cup/2010 Africa Cup of Nations qualifier against Guinea. He scored his first goal for Zimbabwe on his second cap against Namibia, also a 2010 qualifier.

Career statistics

Club
.

International
.

International goals
. Scores and results list Zimbabwe's goal tally first.

Honours

Club
Club Africain
 North African Cup of Champions (1): 2010

Dynamos
 Zimbabwe Premier Soccer League (1): 2011
 Cup of Zimbabwe (1): 2011

Mamelodi Sundowns
 Premier Soccer League (2): 2013–14, 2015–16
 Nedbank Cup (1): 2014–15
 Telkom Knockout (1): 2015

Bidvest Wits fc 
( Premier soccer League) 1 2016/17 
(Mtn cup ) 1 2016/2017

References

1985 births
Zimbabwean footballers
Living people
Sportspeople from Mashonaland West Province
Zimbabwe international footballers
Zimbabwean expatriate footballers
Association football forwards
Dynamos F.C. players
Maritzburg United F.C. players
Mamelodi Sundowns F.C. players
Club Africain players
Highlanders F.C. players
Bidvest Wits F.C. players
Black Leopards F.C. players
South African Premier Division players
Tunisian Ligue Professionnelle 1 players
2017 Africa Cup of Nations players
Expatriate footballers in Tunisia
Expatriate footballers in Libya
Expatriate soccer players in South Africa
Zimbabwean expatriate sportspeople in Tunisia
Zimbabwean expatriate sportspeople in Libya
Zimbabwean expatriate sportspeople in South Africa